Triathlon Australia is the governing body responsible for the management of sports such as duathlon, aquathlon and triathlon within Australia.

History

Triathlon came to Australia in the early 1980s but the first state Associations arrived 4 year later. In 1986, the Triathlon Federation of Australia (what is now known as Triathlon Australia) was founded with the support of Dr. Jim Hazel from Sydney and Geoff Frost from Melbourne. In 1991, the name was changed to what is now known as Triathlon Australia.

In 1989, the first International Triathlon Union's Triathlon World Championships was (or ITU  for short) held there in Australia. The distances for the short course triathlon was also selected that year. The distances for the short distance are (1.5 km swim 40 km cycle and 10 km run.)

Success
In 1990, just one year after the first World Triathlon Series, Greg Welch (born 1964) had won the Elite Male World Championship for Triathlon in Florida. The race was also called the Grand Slam 
Just following Greg Welch's success came Miles Stewart's success the following year again in the ITU. He had won gold and just 2 seconds faster than Rick Wells, another Australian Triathlete. 
Australia's first women success came again 1 year after in the women race. During the 1992 ITU Triathlon World Championships, Michellie Jones had won gold. She won gold again one year later in 1993. 
As of March 2014, Australia is the current leading nation in the sport of Triathlon. The nation currently has 19 senior World Champion Titles.

AYTC (Australian Youth Triathlon Championships)

Despite Triathlon World Championships, there is also a championship for youth from years 13 to 18. To train or compete, they must have a valid membership. Memberships vary from $30(youth) to $500 (professional). The lengths vary for each age group.
13 and 14 years - 400m swim, 12 km bike and 3 km run
15 and 16 years - 600m swim, 16 km bike and 4 km run
17 and 18 years - 750m swim, 20 km bike and 5 km run.

The AYTC was created to let junior athletes develop the sport of Triathlon and to set up the best possible pathway to the Olympics and the Triathlon World Championships. “This event will provide excellent opportunities for our development coaches to identify young athletes with the talent to succeed as our future elite Australian triathletes.” Ms. Gripper reported.

Events in the AYTC all include a draft legal cycling leg for bicycles. This way, junior athletes can compete under the same rules as the Olympics and Triathlon World Championships.

State associations
The national body has eight state member associations.

See also
Miles Stewart
Jackie Fairweather
Loretta Harrop
Michellie Jones
Emma Carney
Brad Beven
Greg Welch
ITU Triathlon World Championships

References

Sports governing bodies in Australia
Triathlon in Australia
National members of the Oceania Triathlon Union